Toomas Vilpart (born 21 September 1971) is an Estonian rower. He competed in the men's coxless four event at the 1992 Summer Olympics.

References

External links
 

1971 births
Living people
Estonian male rowers
Olympic rowers of Estonia
Rowers at the 1992 Summer Olympics
Sportspeople from Viljandi